Nina Mitchell Wells (born September 9, 1950) is an American attorney and politician who served as Secretary of State of New Jersey in the cabinet of Governor Jon Corzine.

Education 
Wells was born in Washington, D.C., where she attended Immaculate Conception Academy. Wells began college at Mount St. Joseph University before graduating from Newton College of the Sacred Heart with a B.A. in 1972. Wells then received her Juris Doctor from Suffolk University Law School in Boston, Massachusetts.

Career 
Prior to assuming her cabinet post in January 2006, Wells served as a vice president at Schering-Plough and assistant dean at Rutgers Law School.

As Secretary of State, Wells served one four-year term, concurrent to the term of the governor. Her term expired on January 19, 2010. As Secretary, she was the state's chief elections officer and oversaw tourism, historical affairs, cultural and arts programs, Native American affairs, literacy, volunteerism, the state archives.

In 2008, Wells was named as a defendant in the case Donofrio v. Wells, an attempt to force her to stay the presidential election in New Jersey pending investigations into the citizenship of Barack Obama. The case was ultimately unsuccessful.

Personal life 
She and her husband, criminal defense lawyer Ted Wells, reside in Livingston, New Jersey. Wells is a Democrat.

References

1950 births
Living people
People from Livingston, New Jersey
Suffolk University Law School alumni
Rutgers University faculty
Secretaries of State of New Jersey
New Jersey Democrats
Newton College of the Sacred Heart alumni